The 1989 Holiday Bowl was a college football bowl game played December 30, 1989, at Qualcomm Stadium in San Diego, California. It was part of the 1989 NCAA Division I-A football season. It featured the Penn State Nittany Lions and BYU Cougars.

Game summary
Penn State - Tarasi 30 yard field goal
BYU - Chaffetz 20 yard field goal
Penn State - Smith 24  touchdown  yard pass from Sacca (kick failed)
BYU - Detmer 1  touchdown  yard run (Chaffetz kick)
Penn State - Tarasi 36 yard field goal
BYU - Chaffetz 22 yard field goal
Penn State - Tarasi 51 yard field goal
Penn State - Thompson 16 yard touchdown run (Tarasi kick)
BYU - Detmer 1 yard touchdown run (kick failed)
Penn State - Thompson 14 yard  touchdown  run (Tarasi kick)
BYU - Boyce 12 yard  touchdown  pass from Detmer (Chaffetz kick)
Penn State - Thomas 7 yard  touchdown run (run failed)
Penn State - Daniels 52 yard touchdown pass from Sacca (pass failed)
BYU - Whittingham 10 yard touchdown run (Chaffetz kick)
BYU - Nyberg 3 yard touchdown yard pass from Detmer (pass failed)
Penn State - Collins 2-point conversion interception return
Penn State - Brown 53 yard touchdown fumble return (kick)

BYU quarterback Ty Detmer was marching the Cougars toward a game-winning touchdown in the closing seconds when he had the ball stripped by Penn State's Gary Brown, who returned it 53 yards for a touchdown to seal the Nittany Lions victory.

Stealing the ball before Detmer could throw it was the only way he could be stopped by the Penn State defense. Detmer completed 42 of 59 passes for 576 yards, all Holiday Bowl records, and shared Offensive MVP honors with Penn State running back Blair Thomas, who rushed for a Holiday Bowl record 35 times for 186 yards.

References

External links
New York Times summary of game

Holiday Bowl
Holiday Bowl
BYU Cougars football bowl games
Penn State Nittany Lions football bowl games
1989 in sports in California